Gyula Bíró (10 May 1890 – 14 June 1951) was a Hungarian Olympic football player and manager of Jewish heritage.

Playing career

Club career
Bíró spent his career as player playing for MTK Hungária FC, where he made first team debut in 1905 as the age of 15 as midfielder. Later he also played as forward. He retired from football as player at the age of 26 after playing 135 games in the Hungarian League and scoring 17 goals.

International career
As part of Hungary, Bíró completed at 1912 Olympics.

Coaching career

He started his coaching career with 1. FC Nürnberg in 1920, before moving to Poland in 1923, where he coached Hasmonea Lwów and later the Olympic national team in 1924. From June 1924 until November 1925, he was a coach of Warta Poznań. He later returned to Germany as coach of FC Saarbrücken during the 1926–27 season.

Bíró coached FC Baia Mare in Romania in 1930s, before moving to the Spanish squad Atlético Marte. He left Europe before the start of World War II and went to Mexico. He worked as an engineer too in the places where he lived, and he died at the age of 71 in Mexico.

See also
List of select Jewish football (association; soccer) players

References

External links
 
 Profile of Gyula Bíró on JewsInSports.org

1890 births
1951 deaths
Jewish Hungarian sportspeople
Footballers from Budapest
Jewish footballers
Hungarian footballers
Hungary international footballers
MTK Budapest FC players
Footballers at the 1912 Summer Olympics
Hungarian expatriate football managers
Expatriate football managers in Romania
Hungarian expatriate sportspeople in Romania
1. FC Nürnberg managers
Warta Poznań managers
1. FC Saarbrücken managers
CS Minaur Baia Mare (football) managers
Association football midfielders
Hungarian emigrants to Mexico